The Night of the Scarecrow is a 1974 Brazilian drama film directed by Sérgio Ricardo. It was selected as the Brazilian entry for the Best Foreign Language Film at the 47th Academy Awards, but was not accepted as a nominee.

Cast
 Geraldo Azevedo
 Fátima Batista
 Ana Lúcia Castro
 Emmanuel Cavalcanti as Colonel
 Luiz Gomes Correia
 Mário de Jacó
 Cláudia Furiati
 Geórgia Maria
 Rejane Medeiros
 Jorge Mello
 Tereza Mello

See also
 List of submissions to the 47th Academy Awards for Best Foreign Language Film
 List of Brazilian submissions for the Academy Award for Best Foreign Language Film

References

External links
 

1974 films
1974 drama films
1970s Portuguese-language films
Brazilian drama films
Films directed by Sérgio Ricardo